The Cairo Guidebook is a supplement published by Chaosium in 1995 for the horror role-playing game Call of Cthulhu.

Description
The Cairo Guidebook is a 112-page softcover book designed by Marion Anderson, with interior art by Mark Ryberg, and cover art by Charlie Krank and Eric Vogt.

Contents
The book is a guide to Egypt in the 1920s, and includes 
 over thirty maps
 building plans of temples and other popular tourist sites
 hotels, clubs, and bars 
 atmospheric information
 transportation options
 scenario ideas

Reception
In the December 1995 edition of Arcane (Issue 1), Steve Faragher liked the book, giving it an above-average rating of 8 out of 10, and saying, "These Call of Cthulhu city guides are a great idea, and this one in particular is full of superb information that's applicable to anyone running a campaign (of any sort) set in the '20s."

In the March 1996 edition of Dragon (Issue 227), Rick Swan admitted that the book "boasts an amazing amount of research", and that the set of maps was "perhaps the best-ever in a Cthulhu product." But he found that the book did not go beyond being a basic guidebook — he was disappointed in the lack of supernatural phenomena ("as scarce as peace and quiet in a daycare center"), the dearth of monsters, and the paucity of story hooks or adventures. Although he concluded "If... you’re hankering to spruce up an Egyptian Call of Cthulhu campaign with some real-life window dressing, you can do worse than the Cairo Guidebook", he gave it a below-average score of only 3 out of 6.

Reviews
Backstab (Issue 1 - Jan/Feb 1997)
Rollespilsmagasinet Fønix (Danish) (Issue 10 - October/November 1995)

References

Call of Cthulhu (role-playing game) supplements
Role-playing game supplements introduced in 1995